Noor Eye Hospital is an ophthalmological hospital located in Tehran. It is a branch of Noor Ophthalmology Complex. 

The hospital is considered a "pioneer" in Iran and has high standards in technology in the region. The costs are also lower compared to other private hospitals in the region.

References 

Hospitals established in 2007
Private hospitals in Iran
Buildings and structures in Tehran
2007 establishments in Iran
Eye hospitals